Chadalavada Anandha Sundhararaman Bhavani Devi, simply known as Bhavani Devi, (born 27 August 1993), is an Indian sabre fencer. She is the first Indian fencer to ever qualify for the Olympics after qualifying for the 2020 Summer Olympics. She is supported by GoSports Foundation through the Rahul Dravid Athlete Mentorship Programme. C.A. Bhavani Devi became the first Indian fencer to qualify for Olympics. The eight-time national champion had failed to qualify for the Rio Olympics.

Childhood and early career
Bhavani was born in Chennai, Tamil Nadu. Her father was a Telugu person from Samalkot town in East Godavari district of Andhra Pradesh who eventually moved to Chennai. Her father was a Hindu priest and her mother a homemaker. C A Bhavani Devi Started her sports career in 2004. She did her schooling at Muruga Dhanushkodi Girls Higher Secondary, Chennai and then attended the St. Joseph's College of Engineering, Chennai and went on to complete Business Administration from Government Brennen College in Thalassery, Kerala.

In 2004, she was introduced to fencing at school level. After finishing class 10 she joined the SAI (Sports Authority of India) Centre in Thalassery, Kerala. At the age of 14 she appeared at her first international tournament in Turkey, where she got black card for being late by three minutes. In 2010 Asian Championship in the Philippines she bagged Bronze medal.

Tournaments and medals
Starting from the Bronze medal at 2009 Commonwealth Championship held in Malaysia, Bhavani Devi has won Bronze medals in 2010 International Open, Thailand; 2010 Cadet Asian Championship, Philippines; 2012 Common Wealth Championship, Jersey; 2015 Under-23 Asian Championship, Ulaanbaatar, Mongolia and 2015 Flemish Open. In 2014 Asian Championship under 23 category in the Philippines she bagged the Silver medal becoming the first Indian to do so. After her successful 2014 Asian Championship Tamil Nadu Chief Minister Jayalalithaa honoured her with INR three lakh as financial aid for training in the US. In 2015, she became one of the 15 athletes selected 'Go Sports Foundation' for Rahul Dravid Athlete Mentorship Programme. Bhavani Devi has received 2 Gold Medals, one each at the 2012 CommonWealth Championship, Jersey and the 2014 Tuscany Cup, Italy. She finished fifth in the Viking Cup 2016 Icelandic International Sabre Tournaments held at Reykjavik. She won a silver medal in the women's sabre individual category in the 2019 Tournoi Satellite Fencing Competition in Ghent, Belgium, after losing to Bashta Anna from Azerbaijan. She made history by becoming the first Indian to win a gold medal at the senior Commonwealth Fencing Championship in Canberra in the sabre event. She beat Catriona Thomson from Scotland in the semi-finals and then defeated England's Emily Ruaux. She trains in Italy as well as at the Sports Authority of India in Thalassery, Kerala.

In 2021, she competed at the Tokyo Olympics.

As of April 2021, she ranks 42nd in the world with 37.0 points.

Awards and rewards
• Arjuna Award (2021)

References

 Bhavani Devi becomes first Indian fencer to qualify for Olympics

External links

1993 births
Living people
Indian female sabre fencers
Sportswomen from Tamil Nadu
Martial artists from Chennai
Fencers at the 2020 Summer Olympics
Olympic fencers of India
Indian expatriates in France
Recipients of the Arjuna Award